Balatonalmádi is a district in south-eastern part of Veszprém County. Balatonalmádi is also the name of the town where the district seat is found. The district is located in the Central Transdanubia Statistical Region.

Geography 
Balatonalmádi District borders with Várpalota District to the north, Székesfehérvár District (Fejér County) to the east, Enying District (Fejér County) and Siófok District (Somogy County) to the south, Balatonfüred District and Veszprém District to the west. The number of the inhabited places in Balatonalmádi District is 11.

Municipalities 
The district has 3 towns and 8 villages.
(ordered by population, as of 1 January 2013)

The bolded municipalities are cities.

See also
List of cities and towns in Hungary

References

External links
 Postal codes of the Balatonalmádi District

Districts in Veszprém County